The Bulls, for sponsorship reasons known as the Vodacom Bulls, is a South African professional rugby union team based in Pretoria and they play their home matches at Loftus Versfeld. They compete in the United Rugby Championship, having competed in the Super Rugby competition until 2020. Prior to 1998, the Bulls competed in the then-Super 12 as Northern Transvaal, as in those years South Africa was represented in the competition by its top four Currie Cup sides from the previous season, instead of the modern Super Rugby teams.

The side won the Super 14 in 2007, 2009 and 2010, placing them among the most successful teams in Super Rugby history with three titles. They were the most successful team of the Super 14 era (2006–10), winning three out of the five titles. They are the most successful South African team, and the only South African team to win a Super Rugby title.

History

Early history
Prior to the professional Super Rugby competition, Northern Transvaal competed in the Super 10, which was a tournament featuring ten teams from Australia, New Zealand, South Africa, Tonga and Western Samoa, which ran from 1993 to 1995. The top three teams from the previous Currie Cup season qualified for each of the Super 10 tournaments.

Northern Transvaal competed in the 1993 season, where they were grouped in Pool B alongside Transvaal, New South Wales, North Harbour and Waikato. Transvaal finished at the top of the pool, with Northern Transvaal finishing third, behind New South Wales. Northern Transvaal did not qualify for the Super 10 (Southern Hemisphere competition)#1994 Super 10 or 1995 seasons.

Early Professional Era (1996–2005)
After rugby union went professional, the Super 10 tournament was restructured. The Super 12 was created, and was to be competed by teams from Australia, New Zealand and South Africa. Both Australia and New Zealand adopted new franchise models for their teams, whereas South Africa chose to use the Currie Cup to decide what teams were to be promoted in the Super 12 each season.

Competing in the inaugural Super 12 season of 1996, Northern Transvaal were one of the 12 teams. The side won eight of their 11 games and finished third on the table – behind only Auckland and Queensland. Jannie Kruger finished the season in the top three leading point-scorers, behind only Matt Burke and John Eales. The side was however soundly defeated in a semi-final by the Auckland Blues, with the final score being 48 points to 11. The game was played at Eden Park in Auckland.

After their fairly successful performance in the opening competition, the subsequent competition of 1997 saw them with three wins and three draws from 11 games. They finished at eighth. Following the 1997 season, South Africa adopted a similar franchise system to that of Australia and New Zealand's, abolishing the Currie Cup promotion system in favour of creating new franchises. The Bulls were formed as one of the four new teams. They did not make the semis in the 1998 season. The Bulls were considered one of the worst teams in the Super 12 competition, finishing last or second to last for five consecutive seasons from 1998–2003. In 2002, they became the first team ever to go through an entire Super Rugby season without winning a single game. This record remained until the Lions repeated the feat during the 2010 season. After finishing fourth in the inaugural competition, they did not make the semis again until the years 2003.

The Bulls finished in 6th place in both 2003 and 2004, though still missing out on a finals position. They equalled there 1996 performance in 2005, although there was a very poor start to the season, it was followed by six straight wins to earn them a semi-final berth, where they were defeated by the New South Wales Waratahs. Bryan Habana finished in the top three try-scorers by the end of the season, and was short-listed for IRB player of the year.

Super 14 Era (2006–10)
In 2006, the Super 12 became the Super 14, with the addition of two new franchises, the Cheetahs and the Western Force. By the last round of the 2006 season, the Bulls, along with the Brumbies and Sharks were all in contention to take the fourth and final position on the ladder to make the semi-finals. After the Brumbies were defeated 33 to 3 by the Crusaders, the Bulls or Sharks could mathematically take the fourth spot. The Bulls defeated the Stormers at Newlands in Cape Town 43 points to 10, which ensured they went through to the semi-finals. The Bulls travelled to Christchurch where they were defeated 35 to 15 at Jade Stadium and knocked out of the finals.

The Bulls lost their first game of the 2007 Super 14 season, going down to the Sharks in Durban 17 points to 3. Entering week 14, the last round of the regular season, the Bulls were chasing an unlikely 72-point win over the Queensland Reds in order to move into second place and get a home semi-final. At Loftus, the Bulls defeated the Reds 92 points to 3, with the 89-point margin of victory setting a new Super rugby record. The Bulls ran in 13 tries with four players getting doubles and Derick Hougaard kicking 11 conversions. The Sharks finished first, so it became the first time that both home venues in the semi-finals was in South Africa.

The Bulls defeated the Crusaders in their semi-final by 27 points to 12, with Derick Hougaard kicking eight penalties and a drop-goal. The Sharks ensured a home-final in the 2007 Super 14-competition by defeating the Blues with a scoreline of 34–18.

When the Bulls met the Sharks in the Super 14 final at the Absa Stadium in Durban the match turned out to be a tight, nervous affair with the Bulls initially being guilty of indiscipline and making a lot of mistakes. The Sharks carried a 14–10 advantage into half-time after a JP Pietersen try cancelled out one from Pierre Spies. The second half of the match was just as nail-biting, with the Bulls gaining the ascendancy in the match, but failing to turn their rising amount of possession into points. A Derick Hougaard penalty closed the gap to 14–13, after which the Bulls made several onslaughts on the Sharks line, only to lose the ball at critical stages. Their match looked to be all but over for the Bulls when Albert van den Berg barged over the line for a Sharks try two minutes from full-time to stretch their lead to six points. However, François Steyn failed with the conversion attempt, and the Bulls restarted with barely seconds on the clock. After regaining the ball from the kick-off, play went through several phases before Bryan Habana received the ball on the right wing. He cut infield and scored the most dramatic of match winning tries, more than a minute after official play. The try was converted by Derick Hougaard and the Bulls won the match 20–19. In 2009 the Bulls again won the Super 14, defeating the Chiefs 61 – 17 in the final in Pretoria.

In 2010 the Bulls again finished top of the log by beating the Crusaders in a home semi final to secure a home final. Because the FIFA World Cup was being hosted by South Africa that year and Loftus was included as a venue, they had to play the semi and final in Soweto, a first in Super Rugby history. The Stormers had beaten the Waratahs at home and would face off with the Bulls in the Final. The Bulls won the final once again in dramatic style when Francois Hougaard sidestepped the Stormers fullback Joe Petersen to score an impressive try.

Super Rugby Era (2011–2020)
The Bulls only managed the Super Rugby South African Conference trophy in 2013 and they were three time conference runner-up in 2012, 2014 and 2019. They also reached the Qualifiers twice and Semi-Final once but lost all three play-off matches.

After the 2020 Super Rugby season was cancelled due to the Covid-19 pandemic a replacement tournament was announced for each country. The South African tournament was called Super Rugby Unlocked and the Bulls were crowned the champions after ending top of the log.

The South African teams withdrew from the competition entirely, making the Bulls the only South African winners of any form of the Super Rugby trophy.

Pro14 and United Rugby Championship Era (2021–present)

The Pro14 Rainbow Cup was announced as an end-of-season cup competition to introduce the South African teams after their withdrawal from Super Rugby. After the regular season the top of the South African log Bulls faced European top Benetton in the final in Italy. The Bulls lost their first match in Europe as well as the Pro14 Rainbow Cup final 35-8.

The 2021-22 season was a tough start for the Bulls with two straight losses in Europe against Leinster 31-3 and Connacht 34-7. The Bulls got their first win in Europe on 9 October 2021 beating Cardiff Blues 29-19.

They went on to finish in 4th place on the overall standings after regular season, securing a home quarter-final.

Location

The team is centred around the Blue Bulls Rugby Union, whose catchment covers Pretoria as well as Limpopo, but also draws players from the Falcons Rugby Union, who represent the East Rand. Through 2005, the Bulls also drew players from the Pumas Rugby Union and Leopards Rugby Union, but in the realignment of franchise areas that came from the expansion of Super 12 to Super 14, these unions were moved into the Lions.

Stadium

The Bulls play all their home matches at the Loftus Versfeld stadium in Pretoria, which is also the home of the Blue Bulls during the Currie Cup season. The stadium is also a regular host for Springboks Test matches, and was a venue during the 1995 Rugby World Cup which South Africa hosted. Loftus was a venue for Pool D matches including France v Tonga, Scotland v Tonga and France v Scotland. Loftus was also used twice during the finals stages – for the New Zealand v Scotland quarter-final and the England v France third place play-off.

The ground has been used for rugby since 1908, and in 1932 the stadium was renamed to Loftus Versfeld in honor of Robert Owen Loftus Versfeld, the founder of organized rugby in Pretoria. The stadium has undergone numerous renovations over the years, and is currently capable of holding 51,762 spectators.

Logo

Current squad

The Bulls squad for the 2022–23 United Rugby Championship is.

Coaches
1996: Dr John Williams
1997: Kitch Christie
1998–1999: Eugene van Wyk
2000: Heyneke Meyer
2001: Phil Pretorius
2002: Heyneke Meyer
2003: Rudi Joubert
2004–2007: Heyneke Meyer
2008–2015: Frans Ludeke
2016–2017: Nollis Marais
2018–2019: John Mitchell
2019–2020: Pote Human
2020–present: Jake White

Captains
 1996–97: Ruben Kruger
 1998: Adriaan Richter
 1999: Schutte Bekker
 2000: Ruben Kruger
 2001: Joost van der Westhuizen
 2002: Chris le Roux
 2003: Joost van der Westhuizen
 2004: Victor Matfield
 2005: Anton Leonard
 2006–07: Victor Matfield
 2008: Fourie du Preez
 2009–11: Victor Matfield
 2012–13: Pierre Spies
 2014: Flip van der Merwe & Victor Matfield
 2015: Victor Matfield
 2016: Adriaan Strauss
 2017: Handré Pollard
 2018: Burger Odendaal
 2019: Lood de Jager
 2020: Burger Odendaal and Trevor Nyakane
 2020–21: Duane Vermeulen
 2021–present: Marcell Coetzee

Statistics

Results by opponent in European competitions
The results for the Bulls vs different opponents in European competitions

 All these stats include playoff matches (qualifiers, semi-finals and finals)
 United Rugby Championship fixtures added 2021–22 - 2022–23
 European Rugby Champions Cup fixtures added 2022–23
 2021 Pro14 Rainbow Cup included.
 Correct as of 1 February 2023

Overall results by opponent in all competitions

The complete results for the Bulls vs different opponents in all competitions

 All these stats include playoff matches (qualifiers, semi-finals and finals)
 All Super Rugby fixtures vs different opponents as Northern Transvaal 1996-1997 as Bulls 1998–2020 included
 All 2020 Super Rugby Unlocked fixtures included
 All 2021 Preparation Series fixtures included
 2021 Pro14 Rainbow Cup included
 2022 Toyota Challenge included
 United Rugby Championship fixtures added 2021–22 - 2022–23
 European Rugby Champions Cup included 2022-23
 Correct as of 1 February 2023

Other notable results:

Bulls records

United Rugby Championship, Heineken Cup, EPCR Challenge Cup and Super Rugby records

 Correct as of 1 February 2023
 Pro14 Rainbow Cup also included as URC points.

All Time Records

 All 2021 Super Rugby Unlocked points included
 All 2021 Preparation Series points included
 2021 Pro14 Rainbow Cup points included
 United Rugby Championship points included 2021–22 - 2022–23
 Correct as of 2 January 2023

Play-off honours

Trophies and Honours

 Team of the Year for the 2010 season 
 Team of the Year for the 2020 season

Major Honours

Minor Honours

Season-by-season record

Gold background denotes championsSilver background denotes runner-upBronze background denotes semi-finalistsCyan background denotes quarter-finalistsPurple background denotes Round of 16

↑ After entering the Champions Cup/Heineken Cup competition from the EPCR Challenge Cup

↓ After dropping into the EPCR Challenge Cup competition from the Champions Cup/Heineken Cup

References

External links

 

 
Super Rugby champions
Super Rugby teams
South African rugby union teams
Sport in Pretoria
Sport in Limpopo
Blue Bulls Rugby Union